Wervershoof (West Frisian: Werfershouf) is a former municipality and a town in the north-western Netherlands, in the province of North Holland and the region of West-Frisia. Since 1 January 2011 it has been part of the municipality of Medemblik.

About the origin of its name Wervershoof are a number of versions. For many, the naming to the homestead of the most popular preacher Werenfridus. Werenfridus was follower of Willibrord and came to the area in 690 to the word of Willibrord and his gospel. He then lived in a farm in later Wervershoof.
The place is in exile in 1288 Werfaertshof mentioned on a map. But the story of Werenfridus still has many followers. Also, both as a parish church dedicated to St. Werenfridus. The church that once stood was dedicated to him.
The population fluctuated between 250 and 400. The number grew in 1817 after it became an independent municipality. In 1868 there were nearly 800 inhabitants. The municipality was then enlarged with High and Low Zwaagdijk and then had about 1600 inhabitants. The village remained a time approximately equal in population. In the early 20th century the population grew stronger but the real growth came after World War II. The village grew into a 40-year period from 2000 to just over 5000 inhabitants. The other places in the municipality grew less rapidly than the village Wervershoof.
The church was beside the village Wervershoof Wervershoof from the villages and Onderdijk Zwaagdijk East (Zwaagdijk). The roads that ran through the town, the N240 and N302. On 1 January 2010, the town 8794 inhabitants (source: CBS) and had an area of 30.85 km ² (of which 6.72 km ² water). On 1 January 2011 the congregation merged with the municipalities and Andijk Medemblik. Together they form the new municipality Medemblik. The last mayor of the municipality Wervershoof was Floris Vletter.

Local government 
The last municipal council of Wervershoof consisted of 13 seats, which were divided as follows:

 Algemene Belangen Combinatie (ABC) - 3 seats
 Christian Democratic Appeal (CDA) - 2 seats
 Progressief Wervershoof (PW) - 2 seats
 People's Party for Freedom and Democracy (VVD) - 2 seats
 Zwaagdijker Dorpsbelang - 2 seats
 Labour Party (PvdA) - 2 seats

Notable people born in Wervershoof 
 Jelle Bakker (1983), creator of Jelle's Marble Runs YouTube channel
 Yvonne Spigt (1988) skater, Dutch champion marathon skating on natural ice 2008 and 2012
 Bert Steltenpool (1994), professional football player

References

Municipalities of the Netherlands disestablished in 2011
Populated places in North Holland
Former municipalities of North Holland
Medemblik